Netherlands v Essent NV (2013) C‑105/12 is an EU law case relevant for UK enterprise law on electricity generation governance.

Facts
Essent NV claimed that Dutch law violated the Gas and Electricity Directives requirement of ‘unbundling of transmission systems owners’, to separate organisation and management of transmission systems (but not ownership of assets). It also claimed a violation of TFEU art 63 on free movement of capital. Under Dutch law there was (1) a prohibition on privatisation of shares in electricity or gas distribution system operators, all of which had to be public, and (2) a group prohibition, so that system operators must not be part of the same group as companies that generate, supply or trade electricity, and (3) a prohibition on members of a group burdening themselves with debts and other things that ‘may adversely affect system operation’. The Dutch government argued all measures fell within the protection of TFEU art 345, that member states can determine rules ‘governing the system of property ownership’.

Judgment
The Court of Justice held that Dutch law was compatible with the Directives.

See also

United Kingdom enterprise law

Notes

References

United Kingdom enterprise case law